Hypolycaena condamini, the Senegal hairstreak, is a butterfly in the family Lycaenidae. It is found in Senegal and Guinea. The habitat consists of Guinea savanna.

References

Butterflies described in 1956
Hypolycaenini